Garrison Hall (abbreviated GAR) is a building located on the University of Texas at Austin campus. It is named after George Pierce Garrison (1853–1910), the history department's first chair and a founding member of the Texas State Historical Association. Construction began in 1925 and finished the following year.

In 1927, the University separated the Department of Psychology out of the Department of Philosophy, and moved Psychology out of Garrison Hall and into Sutton Hall, where it would share space with the Department of Educational Psychology for the next 25 years.

Important figures in Texas history, including Austin, Travis, Houston and Lamar, are set in stone along the hall, while walls under the building's eaves contains cattle brands.

References

1926 establishments in Texas
Buildings and structures completed in 1926
University of Texas at Austin campus